Scarlet Ortiz (born Hevis Scarlet Ortiz Pacheco) is a Venezuelan actress known for her role in telenovelas.

Biography
Scarlet started her acting career in a children's show called Nubeluz in Venezuela. She also participated in Miss Venezuela 1992 as Miss Sucre.

In July 2009 the Spanish language edition of People Magazine reported that she was  pregnant from her boyfriend Yul Bürkle and on March 9, 2010 she gave birth to a baby girl in Mount Sinai Hospital in Miami and named her Barbara Briana. Her chosen godparents will be the actress Gaby Espino and the telenovela writer Alberto Gomez.

In 2012, Scarlet made her debut as a theater actress in the stage play Las Quiero a las dos in Miami where she played the role of a married man's mistress.

She returned to her native country of Venezuela to star as the protagonist in the telenovela Dulce Amargo after 12 years of working abroad. The last telenovela she recorded in Venezuela was Mis 3 hermanas.

Filmography

Film

Television

References

External links
 

Living people
Venezuelan telenovela actresses
Venezuelan expatriates in the United States
Actresses from Caracas
Venezuelan beauty pageant winners
Year of birth missing (living people)